Dallas Taylor may refer to:

 Dallas Taylor (drummer) (1948–2015), American session drummer
 Dallas Taylor (podcaster), American host of Twenty Thousand Hertz
 Dallas Taylor (vocalist) (born 1980), vocalist for the band Maylene and the Sons of Disaster
 David Dallas Taylor, one of the FBI's ten most wanted fugitives in 1953